Chikomba is a district of Zimbabwe. It was previously part of Midlands Province, but was delimited to fall under Mashonaland East Province in the 1990s.

Notable people 
Chenjerai Hunzvi, politician and war veterans leader
Solomon Mujuru, army general and politician
Tichaona Jokonya, politician
Charles Mungoshi, writer
[Alexander Chisango]; international socio-economic development leader/clergy
Trymore chiguvare, politician and writer
Grace Mugabe (nee Marufu), politician and former First Lady of the Republic of Zimbabwe
Charles Utete, former Chief Secretary to the President and Cabinet in the government of the First Republic of Zimbabwe
Mike Bimha, politician and former Cabinet Minister in the government-given of the First Republic of Zimbabwe.
Antony Itayi Jongwe, academic, writer, religious, entrepreneur, and philanthropist
James Chimombe, Musician
Tadios Kudzedzereka, politician, former Member of Parliament for Chikomba Constituency

Villages and townships 
Bhunu Village
Mwedzi  village  
Chandiwana Village
Chafa/Musoni Village
Mwerenga Village
Chirisa hu Village
Mungonhi Village
Chirasauta Township
Chisango Village
Kudzedzereka Village
Mukarati Village
Mtekedza Township
Masasa Township
Warikandwa Township
Kwenda (Manunure) Village
Ruzvidzo Village
Nyamande Village
Nyuke Village
Hokonya Village
Mukandatsama Village
Matandirotya Village
Mudoti Village
Mujuru Village
Mafukidze Village
Nhidza Village
Nharira
Chivasa Village
Muvavarirwa village
Towindo village
Mhavasha Village
Guvakuva
Magamba
Madamombe Township
Mudavanhu
Madziire
Manyere
Mutoredzanwa
Dandara
Maronda Mashanu
Rupere-Musonza
Sadza
Tsuro Village
Wada Village
Sengwe
Masasa
Masvaure
Gandami
Kadye Village
Majumba
Mboe
Majoi
Gamanya
Zabe
Matirige
Mutoro
Mupatsi
Chikasha
Mudeyi 
Daramombe
Wazvaremhaka
Govere
Zvamatobwe
Govere
Chisangano
Maware Township
Shumba Township
Gava village
 Unyetu
Mutusva village
Chandiwana Village
Mbiru township
Musvibe Village
Mashinge Village
 Mtengwa Village
Mbera/Kakono village
Chisango village
Nyakwava Village
Godzi Village
Manyonga Village
Muchembere Village
Magwenzi Village
Chirara Village
Matafi Village
Chigumira Village
Magomo Village
Mupandasekwa Village
Masarakufa Village
Makumbe Village
Nyevhe village/Gwavava
Mutara village
Zimbizi Village
Gwekwerere village
Chimani village

Places 
Chivhu
Mudzimundateura
Gandachibvuva
Jemedza
Nhidza
Maware business centre
Chikara Township
Nharira business centre
St Pauls Kuimba
Chikasha business centre
Zvichemo Business Centre
Gokomere Business Centre
Chirasavana township
Sadza growth point
Munyora Business center
Kadye enterprise/Tatenda Night club
Kumanhika
Pokoteke Clinic & Township
Chirasavana Township
Mutsinze Village
Ndoro Village
mupatsi town ship
chitsvuku town ship
Chiguvare homestead
 Warikandwa
 Zai Rimwe

References

 
Districts of Mashonaland East Province